Wheeling Township may refer to the following places:

 Wheeling Township, Cook County, Illinois
 Wheeling Township, Rice County, Minnesota
 Wheeling Township, Livingston County, Missouri
 Wheeling Township, Belmont County, Ohio
 Wheeling Township, Guernsey County, Ohio

See also

Wheeling (disambiguation)

Township name disambiguation pages